The Konica Minolta Face-Off Classic is an annual college lacrosse event played in Baltimore, Maryland early in the NCAA Division I season.  From 2007 to 2009, the event consisted of a doubleheader; in 2010 it was expanded to include a third game.  The event takes place in M&T Bank Stadium, the home field of the Baltimore Ravens of the National Football League, and it was first held 2007. The event is hosted by the manufacturer Konica Minolta. The inaugural Face-Off Classic in 2007 set the attendance record for a regular season lacrosse-only event with 20,130 spectators. That was broken by the 2009 Big City Classic. The event was not held in 2014.

Results

See also
Big City Classic, an NCAA men's lacrosse tournament held annually at Meadowlands Stadium in East Rutherford, New Jersey

References

External links
Face-Off Classic Official Website

College lacrosse competitions in the United States
NCAA lacrosse
College sports in Maryland
Sports competitions in Baltimore